Rankine Rock is a rock lying 1 nautical mile (1.9 km) north of Cox Nunatak at the north extremity of Dufek Massif, Pensacola Mountains. Mapped by United States Geological Survey (USGS) from surveys and U.S. Navy air photos, 1956–66. Named by Advisory Committee on Antarctic Names (US-ACAN) for David F. Rankine, Jr., photographer with U.S. Navy Squadron VX-6 during Operation Deep Freeze 1964.

 
Rock formations of Queen Elizabeth Land